Boronia warrumbunglensis is a plant in the citrus family Rutaceae and is endemic to a small area in the central west of New South Wales. It is a shrub with many branches, pinnate leaves and one or two pink, four-petalled flowers in the leaf axils. It is only known from the Warrumbungles and nearby districts.

Description
The eight stamens alternate in length with those near the sepals longer than those near the petals.

Taxonomy and naming
Boronia warrumbunglensis was first formally described in 1990 by Peter H. Weston and the description was published in Telopea. The specific epithet (warrumbunglensis) refers to the restricted occurrence of this boronia, the ending -ensis is a Latin suffix meaning "denoting place, locality, country".

Distribution and habitat
This boronia grows in forest on sandstone in the Warrumbungles - Coonabarabran district.

References 

warrumbunglensis
Flora of New South Wales
Plants described in 1990